In astronomy, Pulsed accretion is the periodic modulation in accretion rate of young stellar objects in binary systems, producing a periodic pulse in the observed infrared light curves of T Tauri stars.

In double stars in young stellar objects, a protoplanetary disk is formed around each star, accreted from matter close to the star. In such a binary star system, a strongly eccentric orbit produces strong gravitational forces on the circumstellar disks at periastron, and such disturbance can lead to a temporary increase in the accretion rate onto the star. This increased accretion rate leads to a change of intensity in the infrared, such intensity rising by up to tenfold in the protostar LRLL 54361. Brightness changes in the light curve that have the same period as the orbital period of the binary system, are always assumed to be due to pulsed accretion.

References

Astrophysics